Kunwar Inderjit Singh formed a government on 26 July 1957 after being appointed by King Mahendra. He replaced Tanka Prasad Acharya who had resigned on the same day.

The cabinet was dissolved by King Mahendra on 14 November 1957.

Cabinet

References 

1957 in Nepal
Cabinet of Nepal
Cabinets established in 1957
Cabinets disestablished in 1957
1957 establishments in Nepal
1957 disestablishments in Nepal